Proteuxoa cinereicollis is a moth of the family Noctuidae. It is found in the Australian Capital Territory, New South Wales, South Australia, Western Australia and Victoria.

External links 
 
 Australian Faunal Directory

Proteuxoa
Moths of Australia
Moths described in 1852